Strathcona Hotel may refer to:

 Strathcona Hotel (Alberta), a hotel in Old Strathcona, Edmonton, Alberta
 Strathcona Hotel (Toronto)
 A historic hotel in Victoria, British Columbia